Madhuca moonii is a species of plant in the family Sapotaceae. It is endemic to Sri Lanka.

References

Flora of Sri Lanka
moonii
Vulnerable plants
Taxonomy articles created by Polbot